HAŠK Mladost (Mladost, lit. "Youth") is an academic sports society from Zagreb, Croatia, sponsored by the University of Zagreb.
Clubs named Mladost exist in athletics, field hockey, judo, basketball, bowling on ice and asphalt, fencing, volleyball, swimming, rugby, synchronised swimming, skiing, ice-hockey, ice skating, table tennis, archery, chess, tennis, water polo and rowing.

Probably the most renowned sections are water polo, swimming, volleyball, rowing and in more recent times ice hockey. The water polo club Mladost often wins the Croatian championships and competes in the European club championships, while the swimming club regularly organizes international swimming events.

It should be stated that HAVK Mladost (water polo section of HAŠK Mladost) is one of the most successful clubs in the history of European championships in that sport.
HAVK Mladost won, among others, these international competitions:

European champions: 1968, 1969, 1970, 1972, 1990, 1991, 1996

Cup Winners cup: 1976, 1999

LEN trophy: 2001

European super cup: 1976, 1990, 1996

Many of the Mladost facilities are located on lake Jarun in southwestern parts of Zagreb.

Member clubs
 HAAK Mladost - athletics - based in the Sportski Park Mladost stadium in Jarun
 HAKK Mladost - basketball
 HAOK Mladost - volleyball
 HAPK Mladost - swimming
 HAVK Mladost - waterpolo
 HARK Mladost - rugby
HAHK Mladost - field hockey

External links
 HAŠK Mladost
 List of Len trophies winners
 List of Mladost clubs

Sport in Zagreb
University and college sports clubs
Sports clubs established in 1945
Athletics clubs in Croatia
Multi-sport clubs in Croatia
1945 establishments in Croatia